Mario Antonio Cargnello (born 20 March 1952) is an Argentinian clergyman. He has been the Roman Catholic Archbishop of Salta since 1999.

Biography
Cargnello was born in Catamarca, Argentina.

He was ordained as a priest on 8 November 1975. On 7 Apr 1994 he was appointed as Bishop of Orán and was later ordained on 24 Jun 1994. Pope John Paul II appointed him as Coadjutor Archbishop of Salta on 24 June 1998. He started his current role as Archbishop of Salta on 6 August 1999, after the previous archbishop retired.

In November 2011, he was elected as the second vice president to the Argentine Episcopal Conference.

References

1952 births
Living people
21st-century Roman Catholic archbishops in Argentina
People from Catamarca Province
Roman Catholic bishops of Orán
Roman Catholic archbishops of Salta